is a Japanese former Nippon Professional Baseball player. He played with the Orix BlueWave/Orix Buffaloes from 1998 to 2012 and the Hanshin Tigers from 2013 to 2014.

External links

NPB

1977 births
Living people
Baseball people from Kitakyushu
Japanese baseball players
Nippon Professional Baseball catchers
Orix BlueWave players
Orix Buffaloes players
Hanshin Tigers players
Japanese baseball coaches
Nippon Professional Baseball coaches